Wasswa Serwanga (wasswa meaning older male twin) (born July 23, 1976) is a former American football cornerback in the National Football League and Arena Football League.  He played one season for the San Francisco 49ers and two for the Minnesota Vikings of the NFL, and one for the Los Angeles Avengers of the AFL.  Serwanga attended and played football for UCLA, Sacramento State University and University of the Pacific. His hometown is Sacramento, California where he and his brother were standout defensive backs for the Sacramento High School Dragons.  He is the identical twin brother of former NFL player Kato Serwanga.

External links
AFL stats

1976 births
Living people
Identical twins
Ugandan players of American football
American football cornerbacks
UCLA Bruins football players
Sacramento State Hornets football players
Pacific Tigers football players
San Francisco 49ers players
Minnesota Vikings players
Los Angeles Avengers players
Sportspeople from Kampala
Twin sportspeople
American twins
Ugandan twins
Ugandan emigrants to the United States